Lucas Aaron Stocker (July 17, 1988) is an American football tight end and fullback who is a free agent. He played college football at the University of Tennessee, and was drafted by the Tampa Bay Buccaneers in the fourth round of the 2011 NFL Draft. He has also played for the Tennessee Titans, Atlanta Falcons and Minnesota Vikings.

Early life
Stocker was born on July 17, 1988, in Berea, Kentucky. He attended Madison Southern High School in Berea where he was an honor student and three-year starter.

College career
Stocker played tight end for the Tennessee Volunteers from 2007 to 2010. He caught 85 passes for 956 yards and 8 touchdowns.

Professional career

Tampa Bay Buccaneers

2011 season
Stocker was selected in the fourth round, 104th overall, by the Tampa Bay Buccaneers in the 2011 NFL Draft and signed his contract worth four years on July 28, 2011. Stocker suffered his first injury on the first day he practiced, and was out for a few weeks recovering from a hip injury. He caught his first career pass against the Minnesota Vikings on September 18, 2011 for a 17-yard gain. He finished the season with 12 receptions for 92 yards and no touchdowns.

2012 season

During the 2012 season under new head coach Greg Schiano, Stocker saw some slight improvement in play. He also was praised for being a good interior blocker but again had a season shortened by injuries. He finished his sophomore campaign with 16 receptions for 165 yards and 1 touchdown.

2013 season
Stocker was injured during the 2013 season having been on injured reserve. No receptions recorded for the 2013 season.

2014 season
Stocker was healthy for a majority of the season only missing 2 games late in the season due to a concussion. Though his receiving stats were a low 7 receptions for 41 yards and no touchdowns his game took a turn in a more positive direction as an interior blocker as well as moving to Fullback in place of a suspended and injured Javorskie Lane. Stocker's ability to be an effective lead blocker earned great praise and a new role as a blocking full back after the team let last years lead blocking machine Erik Lorig go via free agency. He also was a solid special teams contributor.

2015 season
On March 9, 2015, after a strong performance at full back and on special teams, the Buccaneers signed Stocker to a three-year contract extension. He finished the 2015 season with 9 catches for 61 yards and a touchdown.

2016 season
In 2016, Stocker played in 12 games recording 5 catches for 23 yards.

2017 season
On November 28, 2017, Stocker was released by the Buccaneers. Before he was released, he had 3 receptions for 18 yards and a touchdown.

Tennessee Titans

2017 season
On December 4, 2017, Stocker signed a two-year contract with the Tennessee Titans. He caught his first reception as a Titan against the Jacksonville Jaguars for 12 yards. The Titans finished second in the AFC South with a 9–7 record and made the playoffs as a Wild Card team. Stocker appeared in his first two postseason contests but made no receptions in either game.

2018 season
In the season-opener against the Miami Dolphins, Stocker caught a season-long pass of 31 yards as the Titans lost by a score of 27-20. On October 21, 2018, in a narrow 20-19 loss to the Los Angeles Chargers, Stocker caught his first touchdown as a Titan on a 1-yard pass from quarterback Marcus Mariota. He finished the game catching two passes for 11 yards. In the season finale against the Indianapolis Colts, he caught a 22-yard touchdown from backup quarterback Blaine Gabbert as the Titans lost by a score of 33-17. Overall, Stocker finished the 2018 season with 15 receptions for 165 yards and a season-high two touchdowns.

Atlanta Falcons
On March 14, 2019, Stocker signed a two-year contract with the Atlanta Falcons.

The Falcons released Stocker on March 16, 2020. He was re-signed on August 14, 2020.

Tennessee Titans (second stint)
On July 31, 2021, Stocker signed with the Tennessee Titans. He was released on September 2, 2021.

Minnesota Vikings
On October 13, 2021, Stocker was signed to the Minnesota Vikings practice squad. He was promoted to the active roster on November 4.

NFL career statistics

Regular season

Personal life
Stocker is married to Daine Stocker and the couple has three kids: Liam, Collins, and Laurel. He was named Academic All-State in football and basketball. Stocker is also an avid bass fisherman and has participated in several small, local fishing tournaments. His goal is to be on the professional circuit after his NFL playing career is finished.

References

External links
Tennessee Volunteers bio

1988 births
Living people
Players of American football from Lexington, Kentucky
American football tight ends
Tennessee Volunteers football players
Tampa Bay Buccaneers players
Tennessee Titans players
Atlanta Falcons players
Minnesota Vikings players